The Folk Next Door was the name of a concert series and CD releases produced on by WWUH, the University of Hartford radio station in West Hartford, CT, USA.  There were nine concerts and CDs in all, one each year starting in 1991.  Featured artists included Sloan Wainright, Dar Williams, Hugh Blumenfeld, The Nields, Please and Thank You Band, Lui Collins, Dewey Burns, Bruce Pratt, Kate McDonnell and Freddie Tane, The Hartford Gospel All Stars, Catie Curtis, and Dave Drouillard.

Discography 
Track/Artist/Title

Folk Next Door 1 
 Lui Collins Friendship Waltz
 The Patons Come Love Come
 Dewey Burns Just How Long
 Please and Thank You Band Pittsburgh Medley
 McDonnell Tane Ordinary Man
 Heartwood I Give You Light
 Donna Martin The Shirt Off My Back
 Last Fair Deal Out of My Mind
 Amy Davis & Dan Gardella Take Me to the Zydeco Dance
 Hugh Blumenfeld Waiting for the Good Humor Man
 Steve Nystrup Canary Island
 Dave Drouillard Oh, Sweet Mary
 Richard Shindell Home Team
 John Whelan Gan Aimn
 Bruce Pratt Drivin' Through the Delta
 Don Sineti The Dreadnought
 Stan Sullivan The Passing Lane
 Delta Boogie May We All Shout Together
 Zydeco Zombies Ossan Two-Step
 The Nields Anchorman

Folk Next Door 2 
"Honey Hide The Banjo Its The Folk Next Door Again!"
 Dar Williams The Babysitter's Here
 Kate McDonnell Seeking Passage
 Catie Curtis Slave to My Belly
 Robin Lawlor Francesca
 Ellen Cross The Letters
 Grassroots Bill Cheatham
 J.P. Jones Bold Troubador
 Hugh Blumenfeld & Ed Smith Friends of a Traveler
 Donna Martin Coming Home
 Lui Collins Step Into the Water
 Hartford Gospel Stars 99½ Won't Do
 Barbara Kessler Happy With You
 Peter Lehndorff East Longmeadow
 Eric Von Schmidt Champagne Don't Hurt Me Baby
 Please and Thank You Band Katy Hill
 Bruce Pratt The Unknown
 The Nields (Just Like Christopher Columbus)

Folk Next Door III 
"Hoot"
 Chanting House Salome
 Madwoman In the Attic Oconee
 Peter Lehndorff Marriage
 J.P. Jones Moving Train
 Jeter La Ponte L2 Jeune Marie'e
 Lucy Kaplansky You Just Need a Home
 Steve Nystrup Weasel
 Kim Trusty Keep On Moving
 Peg Loughran The Traveler
 Patrick McGinley St. Patrick's Isle
 Gypsy Reel White Face Waltz
 Ed Smith I Got a Tune
 Madwoman In the Attic Nothing Like Food
 Amy Gallatin Forever Ride
 Tim Cote Television
 Gospel Stars He Will Understand
 Dar Williams February

Folk Next Door IV 
"Local Color"
 Greg Greenway Ghost Dance
 Erica Wheeler Arrow Heads
 Michael Jerling Starting Tomorrow
 New Middle Class I'll Rock Your Candle
 Jim Henry Baby's Coming Home
 Kate McDonnell Drink the Rain
 Dave Drouillard American Flyer
 Travor Hollow Parallax
 Sally Rogers Hard Work
 Andrew Calhoun Tunnelvision
 Madwoman In the Attic These Eyes
 Hugh Blumenfeld Mozart's Money
 Les Sampou Holyland
 Cyd Slotteroff At Last
 Bobbi Carmitchell Life on the Greener Side
 Susanne McDermott Farther Still
 Greg Greenway Crack in the Wall
 Travor Hollow You Don't Call Me Darling Anymore

Folk Next Door V 
"Cicada"
 Sloan Wainwright Band Hey Girl
 Cordelia's Dad Katy Cruel
 Ratsy Bell Bottomed Lunch Box
 Gabriel Dorman I Am God Just a little Bit
 Chilo Simple
 Salamander Crossing Trip Me Up
 Dana Pomfret Tricks on You
 Bayou Brethem Port Arthur Blues
 Nancy Tucker Everything Reminds Me of My Therapist
 Morrigu Jane's Reel/ A Punch In the Dark
 Stan Sullivan Dark Belgian Chocolate
 St. Patrick's Pipe Band Gardens of Skye/ Over the Sea to Skye/ Within A Mile of Edinburgh Town/ The Waters of Kylesku/ Molly Darling
 Cordelia's Dad A Sailor's Life
 Chilo  That Hair

Folk Next Door VI 
"The Emperor of Ice Cream"
 Karen Savoca and Pete Heitzman You Just Don't Get It
 Jeremy Wallace Johnny
 Lisa McCormick Right Now
 Don Sineti and Chris Morgan John Kanaka
 Jano Cowboy King
 The Mollys Pride Over Dollars
 The Muster Bunch Tatter Jack/ Drums and Guns
 Dana Robinson Wishing Tree
 Scott McAllistar, Meredith Cooper, Jeff Mucciolo Seaside Jig
 Ratsy Leave Her Behind
 Washboard Slim and the Blue Lights Firehouse Blues
 Ilene Weiss Answer to Come
 Sloan Wainwright Band For My Pride
 Sloan Wainwright Band No One's Makin' Me Do It
 Ratsy Don't Judge the Herd
 Ilene Weiss Woman of a Calm Heart

Folk Next Door VII 
"May Day"
 Beth Amsel Saint Mark
 Tom Prasado-Rao Walk A Million Miles
 Peter Lehndorff Peugot
 Chris and Meredith Thompson House Divided
 Mark Mulcahy Tempted
 Justina and Joyce Sip of Water
 Gideon Freudmann Adobe Dog House
 Hugh Blumenfeld Bill's Dick
 Darryl Purpose Child of Hearts
 Erin McKeown Fast as I Can
 Jeremy Wallace Missing you this Morning
 Louise Taylor Deep, Dark River
 Erica Wheeler Nowhere to Go
 Stephen Nystrup Come on the Road
 Lost Wages Tarpology

Folk Next Door VIII 
"Ate"
 River City Slim and the Zydeco Hogs La Valse de Kaplan
 Margo Hennebach and Mark Saunders On Preacher Hill
 Michael Hsu Your Boyfriend, Your Dad
 Lucy Chapin Barefeet
 Joe Flood Big Daddy Blues
 Sonya Hunter Nonesuch
 Einstein's Little Homunculus Celibacy
 Freddie White When Jesus Gets to Town
 Maggie Carchrie Peurt A Beuill
 Mark Erelli Midnight
 Cheryl Hoenemeyer Angela
 Michael Veitch American Song
 Amy Gallatin and Stillwaters California Blues
 Joe Flood Always Will Always Mean You
 Sonya Hunter Prohibition
 Mark Erelli The River Road
 Cheryl Hoenemeyer 2%
 Amy Gallatin and Stillwaters Tennessee Fluxedo

Folk Next Door IX 
"Nein"
 Alastair Moock Lonely Heart
 Rebekah Hayes One Candle Burns
 Robin Greenstein Sacred Song
 Eric Garrison Breathing
 Adrienee Jones and Rani Arbo Uninvited Ghost
 Lisa Moscatiello Second Avenue
 Cece Borjeson (and Ruth George) A 'Soalin' (Trad.)
 Groovelily Sitting on the Fence
 Meg Hutchinson When It Rains
 Meg Hutchinson Ockham's Razor
 Gene and Mim Lose My Mind
 Andrew McKnight Western Skies
 Bernice Lewis Mercy
 Eric Burkhart and Humpty Daddy No One Lives Here
 Kevin Briody Walnuts and Rice
 The Roadbirds West Texas Wind
 Eric Burkhart and Humpty Daddy

At home for the holidays with the Folk Next Door 
 Dar Williams The Christians and the Pagans
 Hugh and the New Coventry Carolers Kosher for Christmas
 Madwoman in the Attic The Cherry Tree Carol
 Ilene Weiss His Initials
 The Nields Merry Christmas Mr. Jones
 Mark Saunders Joy to the World
 Margo Hennebach Winter Snows
 Donna Martin Merry Christmas Baby
 Ratsy If You're Not Dead
 The New Coventry Carolers The New Coventry Carol
 Patrick McGinley/ Mark Saunders Lefty Gets a Gift
 Susan McKeown/ Lindsay Horner Through the Bitter Frost and Snow
 Steven Nystrup Amazing Grace/ Christmas Morning
 Hugh Blumenfeld This Mountain
 Steven Nystrup Greensleeves
 Peter Lehndorff Santa's Back
 Amy Gallatin and Stillwaters Silent Night

External links 
History
Album Folk Next Door
Snybio

Radio station compilation album series
Folk compilation albums
1990s compilation albums